The 1990 FIA Formula One World Championship was the 44th season of FIA Formula One motor racing. It featured the 1990 Formula One World Championship for Drivers and the 1990 Formula One World Championship for Constructors, which were contested concurrently over a sixteen-race series that commenced on 11 March and ended on 4 November. Ayrton Senna won in controversial circumstances the Drivers' Championship for the second time, and McLaren-Honda won their third consecutive Constructors' Championship.

The championship featured a dramatic battle between Senna and former teammate Alain Prost, who had made the switch to Ferrari. Prost mounted Ferrari's first title challenge for several years, and led the championship after three consecutive mid-season wins. Senna fought back strongly and went into the penultimate round at the Suzuka circuit in Japan with a nine-point lead over Prost. There, Senna took pole position only for Prost to beat him off the line; the Brazilian driver then drove into the Frenchman at the first corner, putting both out and thus settling the championship in Senna's favour. This was the second year in succession that the two drivers had collided at Suzuka. Senna admitted the following year that the collision was deliberate, as he was furious that Prost had been able to start on the clean side of the grid and had decided that he was not going to allow the Frenchman to 'make the corner' should he lose the start.

Drivers and constructors
The following teams and drivers competed in the 1990 FIA Formula One World Championship.

Calendar

Calendar change
The United States Grand Prix was moved from June to March to become the first round

Pre-season
McLaren retained  champion Ayrton Senna, now partnered by Gerhard Berger. Ferrari signed reigning World Champion Alain Prost, Senna's great rival and former teammate, to partner Nigel Mansell. Another top team, Williams, retained their 1989 pairing of Thierry Boutsen and Riccardo Patrese. Benetton retained Alessandro Nannini, now in his third year with the team, and signed triple world champion Nelson Piquet, who had had two disappointing years at Lotus in 1988 and 1989. Piquet's contract turned out to be incentive-based: he would be paid US$100,000 for every point scored, though he was also paid a season retainer.

The cars would be powered by the Lamborghini V12 engine, as would the Lola cars used by the French Larrousse team. Tyrrell retained Jean Alesi for his first full season of Formula One, whilst Nakajima replaced the retired Jonathan Palmer. Brabham kept Italian Stefano Modena, but Martin Brundle left F1 to return to the World Sportscar Championship with TWR, his place taken first by Swiss driver Gregor Foitek and then (after two races) by David Brabham, the youngest son of team founder and triple world champion Sir Jack Brabham. Foitek moved to the Onyx team, which was now part-owned by his father Karl Foitek. Arrows boss Jackie Oliver had sold the majority of the team to the Japanese Footwork company, while Italians Michele Alboreto and Alex Caffi replaced Warwick and Eddie Cheever, who returned home to America to embark on a successful career in IndyCar racing.

During the off-season, German teams Zakspeed and Rial pulled out of Formula One. Zakspeed had withdrawn after five unsuccessful seasons and returned to sports car racing, while Rial had folded after just two seasons.

New Italian team Life appeared on the grid, their car powered by their own unconventional (and ultimately uncompetitive) W12 engine design.

In all, there were 19 teams and 35 cars at the start of 1990, meaning that nine cars from six teams would be required to pre-qualify during the first half of the season. The teams were Larrousse, AGS, EuroBrun, Osella, Coloni and Life; the first three all ran two cars while the others ran one.

Races

Race 1: USA

The first race of the year was held on an angular street circuit in Phoenix, Arizona, USA; the race became the season opener so it could be held in cooler and much more pleasant weather, avoiding the  degree heat that made conditions very difficult at the previous race in Phoenix, which took place in June 1989. Unexpected rain in qualifying led to a grid with Gerhard Berger on pole position with Pierluigi Martini second in the Minardi, Andrea de Cesaris third in the Dallara, Jean Alesi fourth in the Tyrrell, Ayrton Senna down in fifth and Nelson Piquet sixth. Alesi took the lead at the start ahead of Berger, de Cesaris, Senna, Martini and Piquet.

Alesi pulled away and Berger was dropping back Senna passed de Cesaris. Berger hit a wall on lap 9 forcing him to pit. He charged back but later retired with clutch problems. Alesi was 8.2 seconds ahead but Senna started to reel him in. Senna attacked on lap 34 but Alesi defended and kept the lead. Senna overtook Alesi one lap later and pulled away to win. Both Ferraris retired with Alain Prost retiring on lap 21 with an oil leak and Nigel Mansell on lap 49 with clutch problems. After that, Thierry Boutsen passed Piquet to take third with Stefano Modena's Brabham and Satoru Nakajima's Tyrrell getting the final points.

Race 2: Brazil

The Brazilian Grand Prix had returned to the Interlagos Autodrome in São Paulo for the first time since 1980, having been at the Jacarepagua Riocentro Autodrome in Rio de Janeiro for 9 previous seasons consecutively, and 1978. The circuit had been shortened from 4.9 mi (7.9 km) to 2.6 mi (4.2 km).

During qualifying, Senna and Berger were 1–2 with Boutsen and Patrese 3–4 and the Ferraris of Nigel Mansell and Alain Prost behind them. At the start, Senna led Berger, Boutsen, Prost, Patrese and Mansell. Boutsen passed Berger early on but could not keep up with Senna.

At the stops, Boutsen ran into a tyre and had to change his nose cone, dropping back to 11th and some good work from the Ferrari crew got Prost ahead of Berger and Mansell ahead of Patrese. Senna was ahead of Prost, Berger, Mansell, Patrese and Alesi. Senna, 10 seconds ahead of everybody hit the backmarker, former teammate Nakajima, forcing him to pit and drop back to third. With just a few laps to go, Patrese retired with a broken oil cooler. Prost won from Berger, Senna, Mansell, the recovering Boutsen and Piquet.

Race 3: San Marino

There was a six-week gap before the San Marino round, at the Autodromo Enzo e Dino Ferrari near Bologna in Italy; a number of changes were made to most of the cars during this period. An almost identical grid to Brazil saw Senna, Berger, Patrese, Boutsen, Mansell and Prost line up after qualifying. At the start, Senna and Berger got away well but Boutsen sliced ahead of Patrese to take third with Mansell and Prost behind. Boutsen passed Berger on lap 2. On the next lap, a stone sliced through Senna's wheelrim, spinning him into a sand trap and out of the race. Boutsen pulled away from Berger but his engine blew on lap 18.

Soon Mansell passed Patrese and then attacked Berger. Berger closed the door and Mansell spun without hitting anything nor losing a place. He set off after Berger again but retired with engine problems. At the second stops, Nannini got ahead of Prost. Patrese closed in on Berger and passed him on lap 51.

Race 4: Monaco

In Monaco, Senna took pole but Prost was second with Alesi third ahead of Patrese, Berger and Boutsen. At the start, Berger collided with Prost at Mirabeau, blocking the track and stopping the race. The second start was all right and Senna led from Prost, Alesi, Berger, Patrese and Boutsen.

The race settled down and nothing changed until lap 30 when Prost retired with a battery failure.  Then Mansell hit the back of Boutsen and was forced to pit and changed his front wing. Patrese's distributor failed on lap 42. Behind, Mansell was charging through the field and passed Boutsen to take fourth. But then he was sidelined with the same problem as Prost. At the front, Senna won from Alesi, Berger, Boutsen, Alex Caffi in the Arrows and Éric Bernard's Larrousse.

Race 5: Canada

Canada was next and at the Circuit Gilles Villeneuve in Montreal the McLarens were 1–2 in qualifying with Senna ahead of Berger with Prost third, Nannini fourth, Piquet fifth and Boutsen sixth. The track was damp on race day and Berger jumped the start and then hesitated. He got a 1-minute time penalty as well as allowing Senna to lead on the road. Senna led Nannini, Alesi, Prost, Boutsen and Piquet.

The track began to dry and everyone pitted. But when Nannini rejoined, he hit a groundhog and had to pit again for repairs. He spun off on lap 22. Berger took the lead on the road but he needed a minute to stay ahead at the end. He charged and was a second quicker than the others as Boutsen spun off while battling Prost. Senna now led from Prost, Piquet, Mansell, Patrese and Derek Warwick.

Piquet after many laps finally passed Prost who was then attacked by Mansell. Patrese retired putting Berger to fifth (he got ahead of Warwick before). Mansell passed Prost and slowly pulled away. With two laps to go, Berger got past Prost on aggregate but could not get ahead of Mansell. Senna won from Piquet, Mansell, Berger, Prost and Warwick.

Race 6: Mexico

After Canada came the Autodromo Hermanos Rodriguez in Mexico City and Berger qualified on pole position with Patrese beside him and Senna third, Mansell fourth, Boutsen fifth and Alesi sixth. At the start, Patrese and Berger jumped Senna while Piquet got ahead of Boutsen and Mansell. Early on, Senna passed Patrese and Berger followed him through. Patrese was dropping back and Piquet got by him as well. Boutsen was the next to go through but at the same time Berger had a problem with his tyre and was forced to stop and dropped to 12th position. Senna lead from Piquet, Boutsen, Patrese, Mansell and Prost.

Soon, Mansell passed Patrese and got Boutsen four laps later as Prost did the same to Patrese. Prost sneaked ahead of Boutsen as Mansell closed in on Piquet. Mansell got ahead on lap 36 and Prost followed him through six laps later. Piquet soon stopped and dropped behind Nannini, Boutsen (who already stopped) and Berger. Berger passed Boutsen on lap 47 and Nannini four laps later. Prost passed Mansell on lap 55 and they began to close in on Senna. Prost, passed Senna followed by Mansell. Then Mansell spun but at the same time Senna got a puncture that let to him retiring in the pits 4 laps before the end and allowing Berger to get third and close in to Mansell. With a daring move Berger passed Mansell but Mansell charged back and attacked taking back second place after making an even more daring pass around the outside of Berger at the fastest corner on the track, the 180-degree Peraltada corner. Prost won with Mansell second making it a Ferrari 1–2 ahead of Berger, Nannini, Boutsen and Piquet.

Race 7: France

France was next, being held at the Paul Ricard circuit near the coastal city of Marseille. The fans were wearing red and a Ferrari did take pole position. However, it was not their hero Prost but Mansell who was ahead of Berger, Senna, Prost, Nannini and Patrese. At the start, Berger got past Mansell while Prost lost out as well. Berger led with Mansell, Senna, Nannini, Patrese and Prost behind. On lap 2, Senna passed Mansell for second and soon after Prost passed Patrese. The order stayed like that until Senna passed Berger who had been too hard on his tyres in the early stages.

Nannini and Piquet pitted early while Berger and Senna went too late. Mansell's and Prost's tyres lasted longer and thus they pitted late. Riccardo Patrese went too late and was the big loser. This left the two Leyton Houses (they planned the race without a stop) ahead with a totally shuffled order behind them. Ivan Capelli led Maurício Gugelmin, Prost, Nannini, Mansell and Senna. Prost then caught and passed Gugelmin who then went out with engine trouble.

As Prost closed in on Capelli, Mansell in 8th place could not get by Berger, Piquet and Senna. Capelli continued to defend from Prost as Mansell went out with engine trouble. Nannini moved into third but was then forced to retire with electrical trouble, while Prost finally passed Capelli with three laps to go. Prost won ahead of Capelli, Senna, Piquet, Berger and Patrese.

Race 8: Great Britain

Britain was next and Mansell, roared on by his home fans at the fast Silverstone airfield circuit, took pole from Senna, followed by Berger, Boutsen, Prost and Alesi. Senna passed Mansell at the first corner and led for the first 11 laps before Mansell retook the lead; the Brazilian then spun on lap 14, dropping down to fifth.

As Prost passed Boutsen for third, Mansell began to have troubles with his gearbox. Berger passed him for the lead on lap 22 but then began to suffer handling issues, enabling Mansell to re-pass him on lap 28. Meanwhile, Prost closed up to both drivers, before passing Berger on lap 31 and then Mansell on lap 44 as the Englishman's gearbox issues worsened.

Mansell remained second until lap 56 when his gearbox failed altogether; he promptly threw his gloves into the crowd and announced his retirement from Formula One at the end of the season. Capelli briefly ran third ahead of Berger before his fuel pipe broke; Berger's race then ended four laps from home with a throttle failure. This left Prost to win by nearly 40 seconds from Boutsen, the Belgian driver in turn finishing four seconds ahead of Senna. Bernard, Piquet and Aguri Suzuki rounded out the top six.

At the halfway stage of the season, Prost led the Drivers' Championship by two points from Senna, 41 to 39, with Berger third with 25 points, Piquet fourth with 18 and Boutsen fifth with 17. McLaren led the Constructors' Championship with 64 points, followed by Ferrari on 54, Williams on 27 and Benetton on 25.

Race 9: Germany

At the start of the second half of the season, there was one change in pre-qualifying: Larrousse-Lola's five points meant that they were automatically promoted into main qualifying, dropping fellow French team Ligier into the Friday morning session. Meanwhile, Coloni had terminated their unsuccessful partnership with Subaru and were now using Cosworth engines, although these failed to improve the team's performance.

At the very fast, forested Hockenheimring, McLarens were 1–2 in qualifying, Senna ahead of Berger. Ferraris were 3–4 with Prost ahead of Mansell and Williamses were 5–6 to complete the "Noah's Ark" (two-by-two) formation, Patrese ahead of Boutsen. At the start, Berger took off better than Senna but Senna just stayed ahead with Berger second, Prost third, Mansell fourth, Patrese fifth and Piquet sixth.

There were no changes until lap 11 when Piquet tried to pass Patrese and went through an escape road, allowing Nannini to get ahead. Three laps later Mansell went through the grass at Ostkurve without losing a place but damaging his car. It proved crucial as he retired two laps later, the damage being too great. Meanwhile, Nannini passed Patrese as the top three stopped for tyres, the Williamses and Benettons planning to go without a stop. Piquet retired with engine trouble.

Thus, Nannini led Senna, Patrese, Piquet, Berger and Prost. Patrese's tyres were very badly damaged and he was forced to pit. Prost then passed Boutsen for fourth with Patrese following him two laps later. On lap 34, Senna passed Nannini for the lead and pulled away. Senna won from Nannini, Berger, Prost, Patrese and Boutsen.

Race 10: Hungary

Hungary was next and at the Hungaroring in Mogyoród, the Williamses qualified ahead of the McLarens, Boutsen taking pole ahead of Patrese, Berger, Senna, Mansell and Alesi. At the start, Boutsen kept the lead but it was Berger who got away best and passed Patrese while Senna was worse and lost out to both Mansell and Alesi. Thus, it was Boutsen, Berger, Patrese, Mansell, Alesi and Senna.

It stayed like that until lap 21 when Senna passed Alesi for fifth but he was forced to pit on the next lap with a slow puncture. Nannini soon passed Alesi to take fifth. The leaders stopped and Berger was the big loser with Nannini and Senna the big gainers, rising directly behind the Williams men. The order was: Boutsen, Patrese, Nannini, Senna, Mansell and Berger. Boutsen then pulled away while Patrese held up the others until Nannini streamed by with Senna following him.

Patrese then pitted and dropped behind Piquet as Berger passed Mansell only for Mansell to get back at him. Senna tried to pass Nannini on lap 64 and tipped Nannini into a spin and retirement. Berger tried to do the same thing on Mansell on lap 72 at the same corner with the same result – a collision but with both cars out. Boutsen won ahead of Senna, Piquet, Patrese, Warwick and Bernard.

Race 11: Belgium

The financially troubled Monteverdi Onyx team pulled out of F1 before the Belgian round, which allowed the Ligier team to escape from pre-qualifying. At the historic Spa-Francorchamps circuit, McLaren were 1–2 with Senna on pole ahead of Berger, Prost, Boutsen, Mansell and Patrese. At the start, Piquet pushed Mansell off the road and soon Nakajima and Modena collided as well, causing the race to be stopped.

At the second start, Senna took the lead while Boutsen sliced into second and Prost dropped to fifth. However, Paolo Barilla crashed his Minardi heavily at Eau Rouge, sending debris all over the track and causing the race to be stopped again.

The third start was clean and Senna took the lead ahead of Berger, Prost, Boutsen, Patrese and Nannini. On lap 11, Mansell went into the pits with handling problems; he went back out but retired eight laps later. On lap 14, Prost sliced ahead of Berger who then pitted for tyres. Senna and Prost, separated by 2 seconds stopped at the same time but then Nannini who was planning to go without stopping came in between them. Then both Patrese and Boutsen went out with gearbox troubles. Prost passed Nannini and Berger tried the same but this time Nannini came back at him to keep the place. On lap 41, Nannini went wide and Berger sailed through to take third. Senna duly won from Prost, Berger, Nannini, Piquet and Gugelmin.

With five races remaining, the Drivers' Championship now lay firmly between Senna with 63 points and Prost with 50. Berger was third with 33, Boutsen fourth with 27, and Piquet fifth with 24. McLaren held a comfortable lead in the Constructors' Championship with 96 points against Ferrari's 63, with Williams third with 42, and Benetton fourth with 40.

Race 12: Italy

After Belgium came Italy and at the historic Monza Autodrome near Milan, Senna took pole again with Prost second, Berger third, Mansell fourth, Alesi fifth and Boutsen sixth. At the start, Berger raced past Prost while Alesi was jumped by both the Ferraris. But Warwick crashed at the Parabolica, bringing out the red flags. In the restart, Berger got past Prost and Alesi repeated his previous effort and had passed both Ferraris before the second chicane, so we had Senna leading Berger, Alesi, Prost, Mansell and Boutsen.

On lap 5, Alesi spun off and retired. Nothing changed until lap 18 when Boutsen retired with a suspension failure and Berger's tyres began to fade. Prost then passed Berger and the stops did not change anything. The top three then began to battle for the lead but none were able to close in on the other while Mansell continued to drop back, fighting a faulty throttle return spring. Senna won from Prost, Berger, Mansell, Patrese and Nakajima.

Race 13: Portugal

In Portugal, at the Estoril circuit near Lisbon, the Ferraris took 1–2 in qualifying with Mansell ahead of Prost, Senna, Berger, Patrese and Piquet. At the start, Mansell got too much wheel spin and he slid across the track and almost took Prost out; as a result, the McLarens blasted by them with Piquet getting by Prost as well. The order was: Senna, Berger, Mansell, Piquet, Prost and Boutsen.

On lap 13, Prost overtook Piquet for fourth and later Mansell went to the grass, allowing Prost to take third. Mansell and Berger pitted soon as Prost passed Senna at the same time to lead. These two soon pitted as well with a shuffled order: Senna, Mansell, Berger, Prost, Nannini and Piquet. By then, the Ferraris started to close in on the McLarens in front of them. Behind them, Piquet passed Nannini to take fifth.

On lap 50, Mansell was close to Senna and passed him to lead. He pulled away fast but then hit Phillipe Alliot while lapping him, pushing the Ligier into a wall while Mansell got away with no damage. Prost then passed Berger on lap 59. Two laps later, Suzuki and Caffi collided and with the latter stuck in the cockpit in a zone with the wall next to the track, the race was stopped. Thus Mansell won from Senna, Prost, Berger, Piquet and Nannini.

Race 14: Spain

Qualifying in Spain, at the Jerez circuit near Seville, was marred by a serious incident involving Martin Donnelly. During a hot lap on the Friday, the Northern Irishman suffered a suspension failure on one of the fastest corners of the circuit, sending his Lotus into the barriers head-on. The car was destroyed while Donnelly was thrown across the track with his seat still strapped to his back; he suffered severe leg fractures and bruising on his brain and lungs. Remarkably, he survived, though his Formula One career was over.

Senna, shaken by this incident, took his 50th career pole position ahead of Prost, Mansell, Alesi, Berger and Patrese. At the start, Senna led away from Prost, while Alesi was hit by Patrese and spun into retirement. Mansell kept up with the championship challengers, while Berger struggled on hard tyres and held up the Williams and Benettons. The pit stops saw Mansell get ahead of Prost before waving his teammate through; he did so just as Senna was emerging from his own stop. The Brazilian, realising that he could not afford to be behind Mansell, dived ahead of him.

Piquet, who had not pitted, held a narrow lead over Prost; the Frenchman pressured him into running wide on lap 29, dropping him down to fourth. He eventually retired with battery problems. Senna began to struggle with a punctured radiator, and was passed by Mansell before dropping out on lap 54. Nannini was now up to third while Boutsen and Berger disputed fourth; the two tangled on lap 57, sending Berger into retirement. Prost and Mansell duly completed a Ferrari 1–2, the Frenchman 22 seconds ahead, with Nannini, Boutsen, Patrese and Suzuki completing the top six.

With two races to go, Senna had 78 points to Prost's 69; both had had eleven points finishes and would therefore have to drop points if they scored again. Senna was still in a strong position, however, as a win or a second place (if Prost did not win) in the next race would give him the championship. Berger was third with 40, Mansell was up to fourth with 31 and Boutsen was fifth with 30. Similarly, McLaren retained a strong position in the Constructors' Championship with 118 points against Ferrari's 100, with Williams a distant third with 49, and Benetton fourth with 47.

Race 15: Japan

Before the Japanese Grand Prix at Suzuka, Nannini was involved in a helicopter crash, suffering a severed right forearm. Though it was reattached using microsurgery, his F1 career ended. Meanwhile, the EuroBrun and Life teams withdrew (meaning that pre-qualifying was unnecessary); Benetton duly took on EuroBrun's Roberto Moreno as Nannini's replacement.

In qualifying, Senna took pole ahead of Prost, Mansell, Berger, Boutsen and Piquet. However, Senna was unhappy at the pole being located on the dirty side of the track and thus the second place being on the racing line which should give the second-placed driver the advantage into the first corner. He went to FISA president Jean Marie Balestre to change the side on which pole was located, but was refused. After this, he decided that he would intentionally drive his race car into Prost's Ferrari into the first corner if Prost had the advantage. At the start, Prost did have the advantage and Senna drove into the Frenchman, who drove the normal racing line. Senna's left front touched Prost's rear wing, spinning both of them into the gravel trap. The world championship was sealed.

Although Senna led by 9 points and there were 9 points for a win, if Prost won the last race he would have had to drop his fifth place in Canada which meant that he would be two points behind Senna even if Senna retired. Senna was the new world champion. In the race Berger was leading Mansell, Piquet, Moreno, Boutsen and Patrese. At the start of the second lap, Berger spun off into retirement after hitting debris from the Senna-Prost collision. This left Mansell who was under pressure by the Benettons leading.

Mansell then began to pull away from Piquet and Moreno as Suzuki passed Warwick for sixth. Mansell pitted with a 15-second lead on lap 27 for tyres but his driveshaft snapped as he went out of his garage. He retired giving the Constructors title to McLaren as they were 18 points ahead and a 1–2 could get only 15 points. The Benettons and Suzuki did not stop but Patrese and Boutsen did with Patrese getting ahead at the stops but both rejoined behind Suzuki. Then Nakajima passed Warwick to take sixth as Warwick then retired with gearbox trouble. Piquet won with Moreno making it a Benetton 1–2. Suzuki was third, Patrese fourth, Boutsen fifth and Nakajima sixth.

Race 16: Australia

The last race of the year was in Australia for what would be the 500th World Championship Grand Prix race, and at the Adelaide City street circuit the McLarens took 1–2 in qualifying ahead of the Ferraris, Senna ahead of Berger, Mansell, Prost, Alesi and Patrese. At the start, Senna took off into the lead with Berger defending from the Ferraris and Piquet getting by Alesi and Patrese. The order was: Senna, Berger, Mansell, Prost, Piquet and Alesi.

On lap 2, Berger accidentally hit the engine kill switch allowing Mansell to get ahead before he could bump start the McLaren. Then while defending from Prost, he held up Prost allowing Piquet to get ahead of the Frenchman. Piquet then soon passed Berger for third and the order settled down. Senna and Mansell continued to pull away from the rest, none of them able to keep up. Soon Patrese got past Alesi with Boutsen following suit.

Then, on lap 43, Mansell went up an escape road, giving Senna a good lead. Mansell was caught and passed by Piquet and pitted for tyres soon after. At the stops, Boutsen got ahead of Patrese. Berger then ran wide entering the Brabham straight, allowing Prost to take third. Mansell passed Berger on lap 57 and soon passed Prost on his new tyres. Senna had a gearbox glitch on lap 62 and went straight on into the wall and retired. Mansell closed in on Piquet, breaking the lap record 3 times towards the finish, taking 2 seconds a lap out of his lead. Piquet made an error with 4 laps to go, allowing Mansell to close right up. Mansell attacked on the last lap with a desperate passing attempt at the end of the straight, was too far behind to make the pass. Thus, Piquet won from Mansell, Prost, Berger, Boutsen and Patrese.

At the end of the season, Senna was world champion with 78 points with Prost second with 71 (he got 73 but had to drop 2 points), Piquet third with 43 (he got 44 but had to drop 1 point), Berger fourth with 43 (Piquet had 2 wins to Berger's none), Mansell fifth with 37, Boutsen sixth with 34, Patrese seventh with 23 and Nannini eighth with 21. In the constructors, McLaren were champions with 121 points with Ferrari second with 110, Benetton third with 71 and Williams fourth with 55.

Results and standings

Grands Prix

Points scoring system

Points were awarded at each round to the top six finishers at each Grand Prix as follows:

For the drivers championship only the eleven best results contributed to the World Championship.

World Drivers' Championship standings

Notes:
 – Driver did not finish the Grand Prix but was classified, as he completed more than 90% of the race distance.

World Constructors' Championship standings

Notes:
 – Driver did not finish the Grand Prix but was classified, as he completed more than 90% of the race distance.

Non-championship event results
The 1990 season also included a single event which did not count towards the World Championship, the Formula One Indoor Trophy at the Bologna Motor Show.

Notes

References

External links
 F1 Facts – 1990 – including race by race image galleries
 The Cahier Archive – 1990 – image gallery

 
Formula One seasons